BTSM or Btsm can stand for:

 Bootsmann, a naval rank
 Black Tiger Sex Machine, a Canadian industrial/EDM band
Brain Tumor Social Media (#BTSM), a healthcare hashtag community on Twitter.